Tayk was a historical province of the Kingdom of Armenia, one of its 15  (worlds). Tayk consisted of 8 cantons: 
 Kogh
 Berdats por
 Partizats por
 Tchakatk
 Bokha
 Vokaghe
 Azordats por
 Arsiats por

There was a proto-Armenian confederation, Hayasa-Azzi, in this area in the 2nd millennium BC. It was probably the same as (and with a name likely related etymologically to) the Daiaeni and Diauehi of Assyrian and Urartian sources. From the 2nd century BC to the 9th century AD Tayk was a part of Armenian kingdoms or "autonomies": Greater Armenia, Marzpan Armenia and Bagratid Armenia.

According to Strabo, the area around Tayk was originally Iberian, but during the time of Artaxias I it was conquered by Armenia.

In the 999 A.D., Tayk or Tao became part of the Georgian Bagratid principality of Tayk-Kharjk or Tao-Klarjeti. The Tayk province covered the contemporary Turkish districts of Yusufeli (Kiskim) in Artvin Province and Oltu, Olur (Tavusker), Tortum and Çamlıkaya (Hunut) to the north of İspir in Erzurum Province. To its southwest is found the ancient region of Sper. After World War I, Armenia and Georgia contested the region, with particular conflict over Oltik. As a result, in 1920, after the Russo-Turkish attacks Armenia lost the region of Oltik, which become a part of Turkey.

Sources 

 Arutyunova-Fidanyan, Viada A., Some Aspects of the Military-Administrative Districts and Byzantine Administration in Armenia During the 11th Century, REArm 20, 1986-87: 309–20.
 Garsoian, Nina. The Byzantine Annexation of the Armenian Kingdoms in the Eleventh Century, 192 p. In: The Armenian People from Ancient to Modern Times, vol. 1, edited by Richard G. Hovannisian, St. Martin's Press, New York, 1977.   
 Hewsen, Robert. Armenia. A Historical Atlas. The University of Chicago Press, Chicago, 2001, Pp 341.
 Tayk - Tayots Ashhar (Тайк - Тайоц ашхар)

See also
List of regions of ancient Armenia
Bana cathedral
 Tao

References

Provinces of the Kingdom of Armenia (antiquity)
History of Artvin Province
History of Erzurum Province